The Civil War Monument was a statue of a Civil War cavalryman by Jack Howland, installed outside the Colorado State Capitol in Denver. The memorial is also known as the Civil War Memorial, Soldier's Monument, and Civil War Soldier. The work was dedicated on July 24, 1909, after being cast by the Bureau Brothers.

Description
The bronze sculpture depicts a Union Army soldier in raincoat, books, spurs, and hat, holding a rifle and with a sheathed saber. It measures approximately 8 x 4 x 4 ft., and rests on a granite base measuring approximately 10 x 8 x 8 ft.

History
The statue atop the monument was toppled on June 25, 2020.
The statue was quickly removed after vandalism and put into storage. The statue reappeared at the History Colorado Center on October 14, 2020.
The display at the History Colorado Center is temporary and will only last until October 15, 2021. Its permanent fate is currently being debated with the statue possibly being redisplayed at nearby Lincoln Park which is already home to another war memorial.

See also

Colorado in the American Civil War

References

External links
 

Bronze sculptures in Colorado
Granite sculptures in Colorado
Monuments and memorials in Colorado
Monuments and memorials removed during the George Floyd protests
Outdoor sculptures in Denver
Sculptures of men in Colorado
Statues in Colorado
Union (American Civil War) monuments and memorials
Vandalized works of art in Colorado
Statues removed in 2020